The creative city is a concept that argues creativity should be considered a strategic factor in urban development. In addition to cities being efficient and fair, a creative city provides places, experiences, and opportunities to foster creativity among its citizens.

Creativity and imagination in urban activities
The creative city, when introduced, was seen as aspirational; a clarion call to encourage open-mindedness and imagination implying a dramatic impact on organizational culture. Its philosophy is that there is always more creative potential in a post-industrial city. It posits that conditions need to be created for people to think, plan and act with imagination in harnessing opportunities or addressing seemingly intractable urban problems.

This requires infrastructure beyond the hardware—buildings, roads or sewage to include soft infrastructures. Creative infrastructure is a combination of the hard and the soft. The latter includes a city's mindset, how it approaches opportunities and problems; its atmosphere and incentives and regulatory regime. To be a creative city the soft infrastructure includes: A highly skilled and flexible labour force; dynamic thinkers, creators and implementers.  In the creative city it is not only artists and those involved in the creative economy who are creative, although they play an important role. Creativity can come from any source including anyone who addresses issues in an inventive way be it a social worker, a businessperson, a scientist or public servant.  Creativity is not only about having ideas, but also the capacity to implement them.

It advocates that a culture of creativity be embedded in how urban stakeholders operate. By encouraging and legitimizing the use of imagination within the public, private and community spheres, the ideas bank of possibilities and potential solutions to any urban problem will be broadened.

The creative city identifies, nurtures, attracts and sustains talent so it is able to mobilize ideas, talents and creative organizations. The built environment—the stage and the setting—is crucial for establishing the milieu. A creative milieu is a place that contains the necessary requirements in terms of hard and soft infrastructure to generate a flow of ideas and inventions. A milieu can be a building, a street, an area or neighbourhood, a city or a region.

The popularity of creativity came about because of the increased recognition that the world, along with its economic, social and cultural structures was changing dramatically. This was driven in part by information technology revolution. Coping with these changes required a re-assessment of cities' resources and potential and a process of necessary re-invention on all fronts.

Cultural resources are embodied in peoples' creativity, skills and talents. They are not only things like buildings, but also symbols, activities and the repertoire of local products in crafts, manufacturing and services. Urban cultural resources include the historical, industrial and artistic heritage of assets including architecture, urban landscapes or landmarks. They also include local and indigenous traditions of public life, festivals, rituals or stories as well as hobbies and enthusiasms. Language, food and cooking, leisure activities, fashion are all part of a city's cultural resources, as are sub-cultures and intellectual traditions that can be used to express the specialness of a location. They include the range and quality of skills in the performing and visual arts and the creative industries. An appreciation of culture should shape the technicalities of urban planning and development rather than being seen as a marginal add-on to be considered after housing, transport and land-use have been dealt with. This focus draws attention to the distinctive, the unique and the special in any place.

Early developments 
Partners for Livable Places (later Communities, but hereafter referred to as Partners) founded in 1977 was important in the early development of the creative city idea. Partners initially focused on design and culture as resources for livability. In the early 1980s, Partners launched a program to document the economic value of design and cultural amenities. The Economics of Amenity program explored how cultural amenities and the quality of life in a community are linked to economic development and job creation. This work was the catalyst for a significant array of economic impact studies of the arts across the globe.

Core concepts used by Partners were cultural planning and cultural resources, which they saw as the planning of urban resources including quality design, architecture, parks, the natural environment, animation and especially arts activity and tourism.

From the late 1970s onwards UNESCO and the Council of Europe began to investigate the cultural industries. From the perspective of cities, it was Nick Garnham, who when seconded to the Greater London Council in 1983/4 set up a cultural industries unit put the cultural industries on the agenda. Drawing on, re-reading and adapting the original work by Theodor Adorno and Walter Benjamin in the 1930s which had seen the culture industry as a kind of monster and influenced too by Hans Magnus Enzensberger he saw the cultural industries as a potentially liberating force. This investigation into the cultural industries of the time found that a city and nation which emphasized its development of cultural industries added value, exports, and new jobs, while supporting competitiveness continues to expand a city's and nation's growth in the global economy.

The first mention of the creative city as a concept was in a seminar organized by the Australia Council, the City of Melbourne, the Ministry of Planning and Environment (Victoria) and the Ministry for the Arts (Victoria) in September 1988. Its focus was to explore how arts and cultural concerns could be better integrated into the planning process for city development. A keynote speech by David Yencken former Secretary for Planning and Environment for Victoria spelt out a broader agenda stating that whilst efficiency of cities is important there is much more needed: "[The city] should be emotionally satisfying and stimulate creativity amongst its citizens".

Another important early player was Comedia, founded in 1978 by Charles Landry. Its 1991 study, Glasgow: The Creative City and its Cultural Economy was followed in 1994 by a study on urban creativity called The Creative City in Britain and Germany.

Anatomy
As well as being centers of a creative economy and being home to a sizable creative class, creative cities have also been theorized to embody a particular structure.  This structure comprises three categories of people, spaces, organizations, and institutions: the upperground, the underground, and the middleground.

The upperground consists of firms and businesses engaged in creative industries.  These are the organizations that create the economic growth one hopes to find in a creative city, by taking the creative product of the city's residents and converting it into a good or service that can be sold.

The underground consists of the individual creative people—for example, artists, writers, or innovators—that produce this creative product.

The middleground, then, serves as a space for the upperground and the underground to come into contact with one another.  The middleground can consist of physical areas, for example neighborhoods with high populations of creative individuals, or galleries and bars where these individuals congregate.  It can also consist of organizations, such as art collectives, that serve to bring together creative individuals.  The middleground allows the creative product of the underground to be given a more concrete form by synthesizing disparate creative outputs into discrete products.  In its capacity as space, it also allows individuals from the upperground and individuals from the underground to meet, facilitating the transfer of ideas and people from one level to another.

The policy implications of this theoretical framework are that, in order to harness the economic growth potential that creative industries bring with them, urban governments must foster the growth of the middleground and underground as well as the upperground. This can be done through urban planning initiatives that create spaces that can be used as a middleground, and policies that encourage the "creative class" that comprises the underground.

This policy dimension of the creative city concept has been criticized by others as being a tool, not for revitalizing cities, but for the creation of an industry dedicated to offering promises of urban renewal.  In Richard Florida's work on creative cities and the creative class, he quantifies various measures of the "creative potential" of a city, and then ranks cities based on his "creativity index".  This, in turn, encourages cities to compete with one another for higher rankings and the attendant economic benefits that supposedly come with them.  In order to do this, city governments will hire consulting firms to advise them on how to boost their creative potential, thus creating an industry and a class of expertise centered around creative cities.

The emergence of the creative economy and creative class
There have been critiques of the creative city idea claiming it is only targeted at hipsters, property developers and those who gentrify areas or seek to glamorize them so destroying local distinctiveness. This has happened in places, but it is not inevitable. The creative challenge is to find appropriate regulations and incentives to obviate the negative aspects. A valid concern has been the conscious use of artists to be the vanguard of gentrification, to lift property values and to make areas safe before others move in this is artwashing.

Critiques of creative city and creative and cultural industries highlight them as a neoliberal tool to extract value from a city's culture and creativity. It treats cultural resources of a city as raw materials that can be used as assets in the 21st century---just as coal, steel, and gold were assets of the city in the 20th century.

Florida's work has been criticized by scholars such as Jamie Peck as, "work[ing] quietly with the grain of extant 'neoliberal' development agendas, framed around interurban competition, gentrification, middle-class consumption and place-marketing". In other words, Florida's prescriptions in favor of fostering a creative class are, rather than being revolutionary, simply a way of bolstering the conventional economic model of the city. The idea of the creative class serves to create a cultural hierarchy, and as such reproduce inequalities; indeed, even Florida himself has even acknowledged that the areas he himself touts as hotspots of the creative class are at the same time home to shocking disparities in economic status among their residents. In order to explain this, he points to the inflation of housing prices that an influx of creatives can bring to an area, as well as to the creative class' reliance on service industries that typically pay their employees low wages.

Critics argue that the creative city idea has now become a catch-all phrase in danger of losing its meaning and in danger of hollowing out by general overuse of the word ‘creative’ as applied to people, activities, organizations, urban neighborhoods or cities that objectively are not especially creative. Cities still tend to restrict its meaning to the arts and cultural activities within the creative economy professions, calling any cultural plan a creative city plan, when such activities are only one aspect of a community's creativity. There is a tendency for cities to adopt the term without thinking through its real organizational consequences and the need to change their mindset. The creativity implied in the term, the creative city, is about lateral and integrative thinking in all aspects of city planning and urban development, placing people, not infrastructure, at the center of planning processes.

The original Creative City vision of Landry has been almost entirely superseded by a Florida-based vision framed by economic innovation and its requisite skilled labor. The Creative City in many places has become a business project, not a framework for total urban policy transformation. It has scaled down its expectations, and no longer demands that urban policy develop a creative imagination. The “thesis” can be implemented as strategy without unsettling too many ruling assumptions on the role of cities in the global economic order. The debate about creative city still contains the two strands - the more holistic notion of comprehensive urban creativity and those that deem that the creative economy largely represents what a creative city is.

Global impact 
In 2004, UNESCO established the Creative Cities Network (UCCN). UCCN was established to share best practices and partnerships that can help sustain and improve a city's creativity. All cities recognized as a member of the UCCN agree that creativity acts as a strategic factor of sustainable development.

The UCCN have seven creative fields: crafts and folk art, design, film, gastronomy, literature, media arts, and music.

See also
Creative industries
Smart city

References

 Yencken, David (1988). "The creative city". Meanjin. 47.
 UNESCO Creative Cities Network. (2017). Mission Statement. UNESCO. https://en.unesco.org/creative-cities/sites/default/files/uccn_mission_statement_rev_nov_2017.pdf

External links
www.creativeclass.com
www.creativeeconomy.com
www.urbanumbrella.net (Non Profit)
www.livable.org
www.meshcities.com
List of UNESCO Creative Cities

Urban development
Urban studies and planning terminology